Comedy Central is a Polish pay television channel focusing on comedy which was launched on 19 October 2006. It was the first channel outside the United States to use the Comedy Central name and the fourth channel launched by MTV Networks International in Poland. It broadcasts some local TV series and a variety of imported comedy programming, including older sitcoms such as The Cosby Show and newer series such as Sex and the City.

Since 2008 the channel broadcasts Polish shows like Włatcy móch, 1000 złych uczynków, Camera Café, Kasia i Tomek, Król przedmieścia and classic show Kariera Nikodema Dyzmy.

On 12 June 2012, Comedy Central Poland, together with its sister channel Comedy Central Family Poland, started broadcasting in 16:9 picture format.

Programming
 The Office - in Polish "Biuro"
 South Park
 Family Guy
 How I Met Your Mother - in Polish "Jak Poznałem Waszą Matkę"
 30 Rock - in Polish "Rockefeller Plaza 30"
 The Big Bang Theory - in Polish "Teoria Wielkiego Podrywu"
 It's Always Sunny In Philadelphia - in Polish "U nas w Filadelfii"
 Two and a Half Men - in Polish "Dwóch i pół"
 The Middle - in Polish "Pępek świata"
 Californication
 Mike & Molly
 Weeds - in Polish "Trawka"
 Call Me Fitz - "Mów mi Fitz"
 Scrubs - in Polish "Hoży Doktorzy"
 My Name Is Earl - in Polish "Mam na imię Earl"
 Rules of engagement - in Polish "Sposób użycia"
 Better Off Ted - in Polish "Korporacja według Teda"
 The New Adventures of Old Christine - "Nowe przygody starej Christine"
 Accidentally on Purpose - in Polish "Przypadek zgodny z planem"
 Arrested Development - in Polish "Bogaci Bankruci"
 Saturday Night Live
 Reno 911! - in Polish "Posterunek w Reno"
 Trailer Park Boys - in Polish "Chłopaki z Baraków"
 IT Crowd - in Polish "IT Crowd - Technicy Magicy"
 Everybody Hates Chris - in Polish "Wszyscy nienawidzą Chrisa"
 Teachers - in Polish "Nauczyciele"
 According to Jim - in Polish "Jim wie lepiej"
 Desperate Housewives - in Polish "Gotowe na wszystko"
 Peep Show
 Sex and the City - in Polish "Seks w Wielkim Mieście"
 Keen Eddie - in Polish "Inspektor Eddie"
 King of the Hill - in Polish "Bobby kontra wapniaki"
 Knights of Prosperity - in Polish "Jak obrabować Micka Jaggera"
 The King of Queens - in Polish "Diabli nadali" - moved to the Comedy Central Family
 My Wife and Kids - in Polish "On ona i dzieciaki"
 Everybody Loves Raymond - in Polish "Wszyscy kochają Raymonda" - moved to the Comedy Central Family
 Yes, Dear - in Polish " "Tak Kochanie"
 8 Simple Rules - in Polish "8 prostych zasad"
 Drawn Together - in Polish "Przerysowani"
 SpongeBob SquarePants - in Polish "SpongeBob Kanciastoporty"
 The Penguins of Madagascar - in Polish "Pingwiny z Madagaskaru"
 Włatcy móch
 1000 złych uczynków
 Blok Ekipa

References

Comedy Central
Television channels and stations established in 2006
Television channels in Poland